Niedernwöhren is a Samtgemeinde ("collective municipality") in the district of Schaumburg, in Lower Saxony, Germany. Its seat is in the village Niedernwöhren.

The Samtgemeinde Niedernwöhren consists of the following municipalities:
 Lauenhagen 
 Meerbeck 
 Niedernwöhren
 Nordsehl
 Pollhagen 
 Wiedensahl

Samtgemeinden in Lower Saxony